Kakyeka Stadium is the main City sports Arena or Stadium In Mbarara City in Western Region, Uganda. The Stadium is in the West side of the main city and it has the capacity of 1,500 people. It is currently used as the home ground for Mbarara City FC, a football Club playing in Uganda's top league Uganda Premier League.

In 2016, the government of Uganda had a plan to be improve all stadia in every Region and the new Kakyeka was to be constructed on another big in piece of land in Mbarara. In 2020, the Ministry of Sports gave out 10 million shillings to the Municipal council to redevelop it, but later on the Turkish investors pulled out of the interest. In 2018, Mbarara City FC was even banished by FUFA licensing committee to play in The Uganda Premier League over the failure to meet the standards at which Kakyeka Stadium was meant for the team to use as their home ground to host in the league This also caused bitter rows between football lovers and the administration of Mbarara District due to use of it to host crusades and other events without maintaining the standards. The stadium is also known for hosting annual celebrations for 100.2 Fm Radio West in Mbarara, dubbed Ekinihiro Kya Radio West.

People who have been here 

 Ray G
 Robert Mugabe Kakyebezi
 100.2 Fm Radio West
 Ykee Benda
 Jose Chameleon
 Mbarara City FC

References

National stadiums
Football venues in Uganda
Athletics (track and field) venues in Uganda